Michael Hill (born May 14, 1989) is an American football running back who is currently a free agent. He played college football at Missouri Western State. He was signed as an undrafted free agent by the San Diego Chargers in 2013.

Professional career

San Diego Chargers
On April 27, 2013, Hill signed with the San Diego Chargers as an undrafted free agent. On August 31, 2013, Hill was released by the Chargers.

Green Bay Packers
On September 2, 2013, Hill was signed the Packers' practice squad. On September 30, 2013,  Hill was signed to the Packers' active roster. Hill was waived by the Packers on October 18, 2013.

Hill was re-signed to the Packers' practice squad on October 22, 2013 after clearing waivers.

Tampa Bay Buccaneers
Hill was signed by the Tampa Bay Buccaneers off the Packers practice squad on November 13, 2013.

Green Bay Packers
Hill returned to the Green Bay Packers for the 2014 offseason and was later released from the Green Bay Packers practice squad on November 5, 2014.

Indianapolis Colts
Hill was signed to the practice squad of the Indianapolis Colts on November 18, 2014. He was released by the Colts on November 25, 2014.

Washington Redskins
The Washington Redskins signed Hill to their practice squad on December 9, 2014.

Return to Indianapolis
On January 6, 2015, Hill signed with the Colts. He was waived on March 12.

Return to Washington
He re-signed with the Redskins on March 30, 2015. He was released on July 23, 2015.

Dallas Cowboys
On August 15, 2015, Hill signed a deal with the Dallas Cowboys. On September 1, 2015, he was waived/injured by the Cowboys. On the following day, he cleared waivers and was reverted to the Cowboys' injured reserve list.

References

External links
 Missouri Western bio
 San Diego Chargers bio

1989 births
Living people
American football running backs
Missouri Western Griffons football players
San Diego Chargers players
Tampa Bay Buccaneers players
Indianapolis Colts players
Washington Redskins players
Dallas Cowboys players
Green Bay Packers players